The Rouxel was a French automobile manufactured from 1899 until 1900.  The company produced two models, a De Dion-engined tricycle and a two-speed voiturette with 2½ hp Aster engine.

References
David Burgess Wise, The New Illustrated Encyclopedia of Automobiles.

Defunct motor vehicle manufacturers of France